Patricia Tolliver Giles (née Patricia Denise Tolliver, born 1973) is a United States district judge of the United States District Court for the Eastern District of Virginia. She served as an Assistant United States Attorney in the U.S. Attorney's Office for the Eastern District of Virginia from 2003 to 2021.

Education 

Giles grew up in Hampton, Virginia.  Giles received her Bachelor of Arts from the University of Virginia in 1995 and her Juris Doctor from the University of Virginia School of Law in 1998.

Career 

After graduating law school, Giles served as a law clerk for Judge Gerald Bruce Lee of the United States District Court for the Eastern District of Virginia from 1998 to 2000.  From 2000 to 2003, she was an associate at Cooley Godward LLP. Her work included  commercial cases in the areas of contracts, intellectual property, securities, and employment law. From 2003 to 2019, she served as an assistant United States attorney in the Major Crimes Unit. She was with the U.S. Attorney's Office for the Eastern District of Virginia from 2003 to 2021, and served as managing assistant U.S. attorney. She also served on the Attorney General's Transnational Organized Crime Task Force MS-13 Subcommittee. In the spring semesters of 2006, 2007, and 2008, she taught the course "Criminal Law III - Moot Court" at George Washington University Law School.

Federal judicial service 

In 2017, Giles had been recommended among a list of individuals to fill the seat left vacant when Gerald Bruce Lee assumed senior status, but the Trump Administration nominated Rossie Alston, who was confirmed. In April 2021, Senators Mark Warner and Tim Kaine recommended Giles to be a United States District Judge for the Eastern District of Virginia to the seat vacated by Judge Liam O'Grady. On June 30, 2021, President Joe Biden announced his intent to nominate Giles to serve as a United States district judge for the United States District Court for the Eastern District of Virginia. On July 13, 2021, her nomination was sent to the Senate. President Biden nominated Giles to the seat vacated by Judge Liam O'Grady, who assumed senior status on May 1, 2020. On July 28, 2021, a hearing on her nomination was held before the Senate Judiciary Committee. On September 23, 2021, her nomination was reported out of committee by a 17–5 vote. On October 26, 2021, the United States Senate invoked cloture on her nomination by a 69–29 vote. Her nomination was confirmed later that day by a 68–27 vote. She received her judicial commission on November 1, 2021.

See also 
 List of African-American federal judges
 List of African-American jurists

References

External links 

1973 births
Living people
20th-century African-American people
20th-century African-American women
20th-century American lawyers
20th-century American women lawyers
21st-century African-American people
21st-century African-American women
21st-century American judges
21st-century American lawyers
21st-century American women lawyers
21st-century American women judges
African-American judges
African-American lawyers
Assistant United States Attorneys
George Washington University Law School faculty
Judges of the United States District Court for the Eastern District of Virginia
People from West Point, New York
United States district court judges appointed by Joe Biden
University of Virginia alumni
University of Virginia School of Law alumni
Virginia lawyers